Despina Vandi Karaoke Vol.1 is the third video album by Greek singer Despina Vandi, released in 2004 by Heaven Music in Greece and Cyprus. A Vol.2 was expected to be released as well, although it has not since been available for retail. The DVD was used as promotion during Vandi's maternity leave with her first child Melina and features mostly songs from her previous album Gia.

Track listing
"Fevgoume Kardia Mou"
"O,ti Oneirevomoun"
"Simera"
"Thimisou"
"Gia"
"Lathos Anthropos"
"Olo Lipeis"
"Ola Odigoun Se Sena"
"Paixe Mazi Mou"
"Ela"
"Christougenna"
"Deste Mou Ta Matia"

External links
 Official site

Despina Vandi video albums
Albums produced by Phoebus (songwriter)
2004 video albums
Music video compilation albums
2004 compilation albums
Heaven Music compilation albums
Heaven Music video albums